The BiH Color Festival is an electronic music festival held annually in Brčko, Bosnia and Herzegovina. Its concept is based on the Indian and Nepali spring festival Holi (Holī). Festival attendees cover themselves in washable natural plant-derived colors such as turmeric, neem, dhak, and kumkum. A further one thousand kilograms of dry paint is shot over the crowd during the festival. It was established in 2016 and is held in July or August. It exclusively showcases unsigned and underground artists from the Former Yugoslavia.

Festival by year

References

External links
 Official website

Recurring events established in 2016
Summer events in Bosnia and Herzegovina
Tourist attractions in Bosnia and Herzegovina
Annual events in Bosnia and Herzegovina
Electronic music festivals in Bosnia and Herzegovina